Charles E. Morris was a member of the Wisconsin State Assembly.

Biography
Morris was born in Utica, New York in 1814. In 1839, he settled in what would become Sheboygan, Wisconsin, where he was an attorney. Later, Morris briefly worked as a merchant in Quincy, Illinois before returning to Sheboygan. He died there on August 8, 1902. He was elected county judge of what would be Sheboygan County, Wisconsin in 1843. He would serve three terms in the position. Morris was a member of the Assembly during the 1848 session. He was a Democrat.

References

Politicians from Utica, New York
Politicians from Sheboygan, Wisconsin
People from Quincy, Illinois
Democratic Party members of the Wisconsin State Assembly
Wisconsin state court judges
County judges in the United States
Wisconsin lawyers
1814 births
1902 deaths
19th-century American merchants
19th-century American politicians
19th-century American judges